Clinton Broadwell Ballard (November 16, 1860 – January 1, 1946) was an American farmer and politician.

Biography
Born in Appleton, Wisconsin, Ballard was a farmer and lived in the town of Grand Chute, Outagamie County, Wisconsin. Ballard served on the Outagamie County Board of Supervisors and was a supporter of United States Senator Robert M. La Follette, Sr. In 1909, 1911, 1915, and 1919, Ballard served in the Wisconsin State Assembly and was a Republican.

After Ballard left office, he was appointed Wisconsin Treasury Agent and then Wisconsin Superintendent of Public Property. In 1926, he ran for the Republican nomination for Wisconsin State Treasurer and lost the election. Then Ballard opened a grocery store in Glen Oaks, Wisconsin on Old Middleton Road.

Ballard died at his daughter's house in Appleton as a result of a stroke.

Notes

External links

1860 births
1946 deaths
Politicians from Appleton, Wisconsin
Businesspeople from Wisconsin
Farmers from Wisconsin
Wisconsin Progressives (1924)
20th-century American politicians
County supervisors in Wisconsin
Republican Party members of the Wisconsin State Assembly
People from Grand Chute, Wisconsin
Leaders of the American Society of Equity